Paige was a Detroit, United States-based automobile company, selling luxury cars between 1908 and 1927.

History

Paige first began producing automobiles in 1908. The company's first car was a two-seat model powered by a 2.2-liter three-cylinder, two-stroke engine. This model continued until 1910, when a four-stroke, four-cylinder engine design took over. In 1911, the company's namesake was shortened to Paige. A six-cylinder model was added to the range in 1914. Four-cylinder models were dropped in 1916, leaving a choice of 3.7- or 4.9-liter sixes. Another name change occurred in 1919, when models fitted with a Duesenberg engine were known as Paige-Linwood, and models fitted with a Continental engine were listed as Paige-Larchmont. A straight-eight engine was added to the sixes in 1927.

On January 21, 1921, a Paige 6-66 broke an American stock car speed record by covering a mile in 35.01 seconds at a speed of 102.8 miles per hour.

The most notable Paige produced was the 1922-1926 Daytona, a 3-seat sports roadster with a 6-cylinder engine. The vehicle was a traditional coupe, with the novel third seat extending from the side of the car over the near side running board. Paige advertised the Daytona as being "The most beautiful car in America."

Paige also produced less-expensive range of cars between 1923-1926. These were sold as Jewetts and were named for the Paige company president H. M. Jewett. For 1927, the Jewett name changed to Junior Paige.

Graham ownership
The Graham Brothers bought the company on June 10, 1927. Joseph Graham became the new president, his brothers Robert and Ray serving as vice-president and secretary-treasurer, respectively. The three, together with their father, also became directors of the company. The corporate name soon changed to Graham-Paige Motors Corporation. The market agreed, and automobile production rose from 21,881 in 1927 to 73,195 for the following year, when the cars became known as Graham-Paiges.

When the second series of 1930 cars was released (bringing out two series for a model year was widely practiced at the time), the name for the product (but not for the corporate name) changed to just Graham.

Gallery

See also
 List of defunct United States automobile manufacturers

References

Defunct motor vehicle manufacturers of the United States
Motor vehicle manufacturers based in Michigan
Vehicle manufacturing companies established in 1908
1908 establishments in Michigan
Defunct manufacturing companies based in Detroit
Brass Era vehicles
Vintage vehicles
1900s cars
1910s cars
1920s cars
Luxury motor vehicle manufacturers
Luxury vehicles
Vehicle manufacturing companies disestablished in 1928
Cars introduced in 1908